Jacob C. Isacks (January 1, 1767August 31, 1835 ) was an American politician who represented Tennessee in the United States House of Representatives.

Biography
Isacks was born in Montgomery County in the Province of Pennsylvania and later moved to Winchester, Tennessee. He was elected as a Jackson Republican to the Eighteenth Congress and was re-elected as a Jacksonian to the Nineteenth through Twenty-second Congresses. He was in office from March 4, 1821 to March 3, 1833.  He was chairman of the U.S. House Committee on Public Lands during the Twentieth and Twenty-first Congresses.  He was an unsuccessful candidate for re-election in 1832. He owned slaves. He died in Winchester, Tennessee. The location of his place of interment is unknown.

References

External links
 

1767 births
1835 deaths
People from Montgomery County, Pennsylvania
People of colonial Pennsylvania
Democratic-Republican Party members of the United States House of Representatives from Tennessee
Jacksonian members of the United States House of Representatives from Tennessee
American slave owners